The Strachey method for magic squares is an algorithm for generating magic squares of singly even order 4k + 2. An example of magic square of order 6 constructed with the Strachey method:

Strachey's method of construction of singly even magic square of order n = 4k + 2.

1. Divide the grid into 4 quarters each having n2/4 cells and name them crosswise thus

2. Using the Siamese method (De la Loubère method) complete the individual magic squares of odd order 2k + 1 in subsquares A, B, C, D, first filling up the sub-square A with the numbers 1 to n2/4, then the sub-square B with the numbers n2/4 + 1 to 2n2/4,then the sub-square C with the numbers 2n2/4 + 1 to 3n2/4,  then the sub-square D with the numbers 3n2/4 + 1 to n2. As a running example, we consider a 10×10 magic square, where we have divided the square into four quarters. The quarter A contains a magic square of numbers from 1 to 25, B a magic square of numbers from 26 to 50, C a magic square of numbers from 51 to 75, and D a magic square of numbers from 76 to 100.  

3. Exchange the leftmost k columns in sub-square A with the corresponding columns of sub-square D.
				

											
4. Exchange the rightmost k - 1 columns in sub-square C with the corresponding columns of sub-square B.

											
5. Exchange the middle cell of the leftmost column of sub-square A with the corresponding cell of sub-square D. Exchange the central cell in sub-square A with the corresponding cell of sub-square D.
												

											
The result is a magic square of order n=4k + 2.

References

See also
Conway's LUX method for magic squares
Siamese method

Magic squares